Rag Doll is the name of three different supervillains appearing in American comic books published by DC Comics. The first, Peter Merkel, is a villain of the original Flash, while the second is an enemy of Starman and the third is the son of the original and a member of the Secret Six.

Rag Doll also appears in the fifth and sixth seasons of The Flash, portrayed by Troy James and voiced by Phil LaMarr.

Publication history
Rag Doll was first introduced as an adversary for the Golden age Flash in a story published in Flash Comics #36 (December 1942), created by writer Gardner Fox and artist Lou Ferstadt.

In the Starman series, James Robinson revived the character, giving him a darker reimagining under the name Colby Zag.

His son, Peter Merkel Jr., most recently used his father's name as a member of the Secret Six.

Fictional character biography

Peter Merkel

Golden Age
Peter Merkel, a native of the Midwestern United States, was born with a unique condition, "triple-jointedness". Like the more common "double-jointedness", Merkel's condition was characterized by extremely extensible ligaments and tendons, though to a significantly extended degree. The son of a side-show barker, Merkel found work in a small local carnival as a contortionist and eccentric dancer. In the early 1940s, the carnival fell on hard times and Merkel found himself out of work. Wandering the streets, Merkel despaired of having money. Seeing large boxes of toys being loaded into a department store, Merkel hit on the idea of hiding himself in one of the large rag dolls and then robbing the store after closing. Going unnoticed among the toys, Merkel carried his idea one step further: He would rob while still hidden in the Rag Doll suit. In these earliest days of costumed villains, the idea seemed novel and Merkel decided that no one would believe that a Rag Doll could commit crime.

In time, the legend of the Rag Doll grew far and wide. Petty crooks began to seek out the Rag Doll, to take advantage of his criminal success. In 1943, the Rag Doll moved his operation to Keystone City. There, he had his thugs deliver him as a gift to a young heiress named Geralda Cummins. The young girl was holding a much-touted party for her circle of socialites and the Rag Doll aimed to take advantage of the situation. To coordinate the event, Cummins had selected Joan Williams who had recently begun a party and festival business. It was decided that each of the wealthy guests would donate $10,000 in defense bonds to serve as a prize in a treasure hunt. Whoever solved the hunt first, won the prize. Unknown to Joan, the doll Geralda had received as a gift was listening and planning a much different outcome.

The next evening, the guests gathered to hear the reading of the first clue. As the guests departed, the Rag Doll signaled his thugs to follow them to the museum while he stayed to interrogate Joan Williams. His ploy was delayed however, by the untimely arrival of Williams' beau, Flash. While the Rag Doll remained in hiding, Williams and the Flash departed for the museum to provide the next clue. On their arrival, they were waylaid by the Rag Doll's thugs. While the Flash made short work of the henchmen, the Rag Doll himself drugged Joan with chloroform and stole the remaining clue. With these, he could find the treasure himself.

With the henchmen wrapped up, the Flash returned to find Joan amnesiac from the chloroform and with no recollection as to the location of the bonds. Taking the first clue, the Flash then began to solve the puzzle at super-speed and intercepted the Rag Doll on the 4th clue, at a local aquarium. The Rag Doll got the jump on Garrick with a swift blow to the skull and dumped the hero into an aquarium containing a giant octopus. He then raced quickly back to the Cummins estate to solve the treasure hunt with the 5th clue. Meanwhile, the Flash came to and after a tussle with the octopus, hotly pursued the criminal. He arrived just in time to see the Rag Doll pull the defense bonds out of their hiding place in the Cummins' grand piano. Quickly, and literally, tying the villain in knots, the Flash returned the gift and carted the outlandish criminal off to the Keystone City Jail.

Silver Age
Flash is reported to have had several other encounters with the Rag Doll over the years but none have been recorded. In the mid-1970s, the Rag Doll became a pawn in a rather bizarre series of robberies. After an encounter with the Thinker, the Rag Doll became brainwashed to commit crimes based on dolls. When the Flash intercepted the criminal, mundane "accidents" befell the elder speedster, undermining his self-confidence. The Thinker's plan was to destroy the Flash's self-esteem to the point that the hero would be too ineffectual to stop his grander plans. The Thinker was undone however, by a surprise visit from the Silver Age Flash, Barry Allen, who quickly captured the former carnival worker. Allen also noticed a bizarre aura around the heads of Garrick and Merkel, suggesting that each was being manipulated in some way. At Merkel's interrogation, the Rag Doll swore that he had no recollection of any crimes, convincing Allen that there was a greater force at work. Quickly switching Merkel for a real rag doll, he convinced Garrick and the Keystone police that a bizarre transmogrification had occurred and that Merkel was somehow dead. He then departed, only to return and hide in the evidence room when the Thinker himself paid a visit to confirm the demise of his agent. Caught red-handed, the Thinker was quickly apprehended by the two Flashes and both the Thinker and the Rag Doll were returned to prison.

In the early 1980s, the Rag Doll was contacted by the Ultra-Humanite, a long-standing foe of the Justice Society. Along with other elder villains as well as new younger recruits, the Rag Doll became a founding member of the second generation of the Secret Society of Super Villains. The Ultra-Humanite had devised a machine that, for the sacrifice of ten heroes from the Justice Society and Justice League to be held in stasis, (five from each team), all the heroes on Earth would disappear. Each villain then was assigned to dispose of his long-time nemesis and the Rag Doll took the Flash. After delivering a false tip to the Flash, the Rag Doll ambushed the hero on a freight ship in Keystone Harbor. After luring him into the hold, the Flash learned too late that all he would find there was a bomb, the explosion of which dropped the unconscious hero at the feet of his adversary.

As the other members of the Secret Society completed their task, the heroes were dispatched to Limbo, clearing Earth of costumed heroes. Unfortunately, the Ultra-Humanite had deceived the Earth-One villains into helping, by telling them they had an equal chance of their Earth being purged of heroes. This was not true. The Earth -One villains were placed in Limbo, but, while the Rag Doll and his colleagues waged a massive crime wave, the villains rescued the captured heroes in Limbo. In short order, the Secret Society of Super-Villains were consigned to Limbo and the balance of heroes on Earth was restored.

Limbo would not prove a prison for the Rag Doll for long. While trapped there, the Ultra-Humanite made contact with himself in the past, when he occupied the body of Dolores Winters in 1942. Through the contact of advanced information, the Ultra-Humanite taught himself a way to open a portal to Limbo in the 1940s. On doing so, the Rag Doll and other members of the Secret Society escaped to assist the young Humanite defeat the All-Star Squadron. After a romp across the landscape of their youth, the aging villains proved no match for the large numbers of heroes and were beaten back to Limbo.

Modern Age
By the late 1980s, the Rag Doll was well into his 60s. His hyper-elastic ligaments had begun to collapse and over-extend, causing the villain great pain. Using his persuasive speaking skills he learned as a circus barker, he gathered together a cult of followers which he used to initiate a crime wave in Opal City. Ted "Starman" Knight, unable to stop the madman, asked Justice Society of America members Green Lantern, the Flash, the Hourman, and Dr. Mid-Nite to assist him. The heroes thwarted Rag Doll's plans and captured the villain. Restrained, Rag Doll taunted the heroes, telling him that he would command his horde from prison. He threatened the lives of Jay, Alan and Ted's families. While the JSA listened, the Rag Doll managed to slip free of his bonds. In the confusion, the Rag Doll was killed. It has since been largely concluded that Starman, fearing for the safety of his sons, had slain the villain, a fact disputed by witnesses the Flash and Green Lantern. The next afternoon, the Rag Doll's body disappeared from the morgue.

Exactly how the Rag Doll survived is unknown. His body was retrieved by his cult followers. Some years later, the Rag Doll was approached by the demon-lord Neron. In exchange for Rag Doll's soul, Neron restored the villain's youth and health and enhanced his flexibility. He also instructed the Rag Doll to remain hidden until approached by a man named Simon Culp. Years later, Culp did come looking for the Rag Doll's help. Trapped in the form of the Shade, Culp explained that he had a profitable plan to launch against Opal City and the Shade. The Rag Doll agreed to help.

The Rag Doll helped Culp's gang subdue Starman when the alien attempted to make contact with Ted Knight.The Rag Doll watched as Culp cast a spell on the Black Pirate, causing Opal City to become encased in a shadow-dome. The Rag Doll and his gang then helped Culp seize control of the entire city. The villains then paraded their prisoners, baiting Jack Knight into a confrontation. Jack held his own until, cut off from the stars, his Cosmic Rod failed. As the Rag Doll and the villains beat Jack down, the Shade fell to the ground as Culp emerged from within his shadow form.

Just as Culp was about to slit Knight's throat, Adam Strange and Black Condor attacked. Their distraction enabled Knight to fight his way free. The three heroes freed Culp's prisoners and escaped. Culp and his gang remained in custody of the Shade, however, and withdrew to prepare for the final rite. While Culp prepared, he sent Mist, Solomon Grundy, Rag Doll, and Crusher to search for the escaped heroes.

Ted confronted Doctor Phosphorus in the streets of Opal and, no longer needing to be cautious of his health, fought the villain toe-to-toe. Ted defeated his radioactive foe, but as he was about to deliver a killing blow, he was ambushed by the Rag Doll. Phosphorus quickly recovered and the two villains closed in on Knight. As they moved in for the kill, Ted used his Cosmic Rod to tear the pavement from beneath Phosphorus and drive him into the earth, killing the villain. With that, the Rod's charge was exhausted. Ted turned to face the Rag Doll, challenging the villain to kill him, sparing him a suffering death from Phosphorus' radiation poisoning. The Rag Doll then turned and left.

The Rag Doll was then recruited to join a new version of the Injustice Society. He helped rescue Icicle II from incarceration, leading to a showdown with the JSA. In the ensuing battle, the Injustice Society used strange discs to teleport the elder JSAers away. Their mission accomplished, the Injustice Society disappeared.

He then briefly rejoined a reformed version of the Secret Society of Super Villains. During an assault against the Secret Six, he battled his son (who had taken over the Rag Doll identity). Their battle was cut short by other attacking villains.

Soon afterward, the Rag Doll died while on a mission with the reformed Injustice Society. The team was attempting to retrieve the Cosmic Key (which would return Johnny Sorrow), but they were betrayed by the Society. In the midst of the battle, it appeared as if that the Rag Doll and the Gentleman Ghost betrayed their comrades and ran away with the Key. However, the Tigress witnessed the return of Johnny Sorrow, whose sudden emergence killed the Rag Doll, although the Gentleman Ghost was prepared for it, as he handed Sorrow his all-important mask. Sorrow and the rest of the Injustice Society escaped to safety in the Crooked House, the former abode of Prometheus. It was then revealed that the Gentleman Ghost, the Wizard and the Icicle II were expecting the Rag Doll to turn on them, so they set him up to die.

The New 52
In September 2011, The New 52 rebooted DC's continuity. In this new timeline, Peter Merkel has been incarcerated in Arkham Asylum. Merkel first appears as one of the many inmates attempting to escape in a riot. Merkel later takes part in the Arkham War.

Colby Zag
Jack Knight has also squared off against a mentally unbalanced impostor named Colby Zag, created by James Robinson. During the time when the original Rag Doll was believed dead, Zag met band player Mr. Tyrell through the internet. Tyrell had bribed his former bandmates to keep quiet about his involvement in a drug related death. Eventually, his bandmates began extorting more money from him, so Tyrell planned to kill them. He helped Zag adopt the personality and mannerisms of the Rag Doll and sent him to kill the extortionists. Zag succeeded in killing four of the five men, but was stopped thanks to the intervention of Jack Knight.

Peter Merkel, Jr.

Peter Merkel has a son named Peter Merkel Jr. who also operated as Rag Doll.

Ragdoll's other children
Besides his son, Peter Merkel stated to Icicle that he had many other children. This seems backed up by Peter Merkel Junior's mention of having a triple-jointed brother and the recent appearances of his daughter Alex, a.k.a. Junior, who it is heavily implied he sexually abused. Along with his children, Rag Doll also had his cult followers, who all apparently committed suicide while blowing up their house.

Powers and abilities
Rag Doll is a master contortionist and, in later years, successful hypnotist through oratories he delivers. His body is absorbent enough to withstand concussive forces capable of rendering most human individuals unconscious. He is an adequate marksman and typically relies on the element of surprise. He is a skilled thief, and augments his stealth with his ability to hide in unexpected places where a human normally could not place themselves.

In other media

 An unidentified Rag Doll appears in The Batman, voiced by Jeff Bennett. This version is able to bend himself into every imaginable position and withstand being wholly crushed. Additionally, his fighting style includes swinging his arms and legs lazily at his opponent, as well as bending himself into different positions when attacking or dodging.
 The Peter Merkel incarnation of Rag Doll appeared in The Flash, portrayed by contortionist Troy James and voiced by Phil LaMarr. This version is an African-American criminal who was "crushed, snapped, [and] broken" by shrapnel from the Thinker's Enlightenment satellite, giving him the ability to stretch and contort himself in nightmarish ways.

References

External links
 The Comic Archives: The Rag Doll
 The Rag Doll Profile at Legions of Gotham.org
 Rag Doll Rap Sheet
 The Rag Doll's Animated Profile (The Batman)
 Rag Doll Animated Bio
 Alan Kistler's Profile On: THE FLASH - A detailed analysis of the history of the Flash by comic book historian Alan Kistler. Covers information all the way from Jay Garrick to Barry Allen to today, as well as discussions on the various villains and Rogues who fought the Flash. Various art scans.

Comics characters introduced in 1999
Characters created by Gardner Fox
Fictional professional thieves
Comics characters introduced in 1942
DC Comics supervillains
Golden Age supervillains
Fictional contortionists
DC Comics martial artists
Fictional characters who have made pacts with devils
Fictional cult leaders
Characters created by James Robinson
Flash (comics) characters